"Martin Eden" is a song by American singer-songwriter Bill Hughes written for the 1979 TV mini-series Martin Eden based on the Jack London novel Martin Eden, directed by Giacomo Battiato and starring Christopher Connelly. The song is the vocal version of the composers' theme with music written by Italian composers Ruggero Cini and Dario Farina and lyrics by Bill Hughes.

CBS/Epic arranged the collaboration between Hughes in the US and Ruggero Cini and Dario Farina Italy. Hughes wrote the lyrics and flew to Rome for the recording.

Martin Eden was released as a single in Europe by CBS. The song charted in several territories including Sweden, where it entered the chart on January 31 and peaked at number 2 on March 7, 1981.

In Germany, it was first broadcast on Sunday, October 12, 1980, and the three following Sundays.

CBS Germany released "Martin Eden" both as a single and as an additional track on Hughes Dream Master album, with "Martin Eden" appearing as the first track.  A still photo of Christopher Connelly from the Italian film appears as the album cover artwork with a thumbnail inset of the photo of Hughes from the original Dream Master album cover artwork in the upper right-hand corner.  Both of the titles, "Dream Master" and "Martin Eden", appear on the vinyl disc cover art.

Tracklist

Formats

Petr Rezek version 
Czech artist Petr Rezek recorded "Martin Eden"  with the Czech lyrics and title "Tulák Po Hvězdách" (Wandering in the Stars) as a single in 1984. It was recorded with his band Centrum.

"Tulák Po Hvězdách (Martin Eden)" was included in the Peter Rezek retrospective album Pop Gallerie, released by Supraphon in 2008.

Cover versions 
 Smugglers, Poland, 2009
Las Mejores Series de TV Vol. 2, 2014

References

External links 
 
 https://pro.imdb.com/title/tt0081134/

1979 singles
Songs written by Billie Hughes
CBS Records singles
1979 songs
Songs with music by Ruggero Cini
Billie Hughes songs
Songs written for films
Czech songs
Epic Records singles
CBS Records albums
Music based on novels
Music based on literature
1984 singles
1979 albums
Songs written by Dario Farina
Italian pop songs
Czech-language songs
Television drama theme songs
Adaptations of works by Jack London